Super Sunshine is Gary Chaw's third album was released on 4 January 2008.

Track listing
All songs composed by Gary Chaw; "Super Sunshine" contains sample of Jimmie Davis' composition (or Traditional Ukrainian folk melody) "You Are My Sunshine"; "你的歌" contains samples of previously Gary Chaw's own songs.
Lyricists are listed below.
Super Sunshine  Lyricist: 阿丹
起床歌  Lyricists: Gary Chaw/阿丹
無辜  Lyricist: 王中言
妹妹要快樂  Lyricist: 鄔裕康
吹吹風  Lyricists: Gary Chaw/阿丹
奈斯男孩  Lyricist: 阿丹
單數  Lyricist: 李焯雄
愛到最後一秒也不委屈  Lyricist: 姚謙
愛愛  Lyricist: 鄔裕康
愛的弧度  Lyricist: 林夕
你的歌  Lyricist: Gary Chaw

References

External links
Gary Chaw Super Sunshine Album Lyrics
Super Sunshine - Gary Chaw - KKBOX

Gary Chaw albums
2008 albums
Mandopop albums